Quercus edithiae is a species of tree in the family Fagaceae and the "ring-cupped oak" sub-genus. It has been found in Vietnam and also in southern China, in the Provinces of Guangdong, Guangxi, and Hainan.  In Vietnam it is called sồi editha. It is placed in subgenus Cerris, section Cyclobalanopsis.

Quercus edithiae is a tree up to 20 m. tall with hairless twigs.  
The leathery leaves are glabrous, oblong-elliptic to obovate, 50-160 × 20–60 mm, with a 20–30 mm petiole.  
The acorn is ellipsoid to cylindric-ellipsoid, 30-45 × 20–30 mm, with a scar approx. 7 mm in diameter.

References

External links
line drawing, Flora of China Illustrations vol. 4, figure 377, drawings 5-7 at upper right

edithiae
Flora of Vietnam
Trees of Vietnam
Flora of China
Plants described in 1900